Jonas Offrell (1803 – 1863) was a Swedish priest who developed a revolver at the same time and independently of Samuel Colt.

References 

1803 births
1863 deaths
19th-century Swedish inventors
Burials at Uppsala old cemetery